Priyanka Rani Joshi (born 19 March 1998) is a Nepalese model and pageant titleholder as Miss Nepal World 2022. She will represent Nepal in Miss World 2023. She is crowned as the 26th title winner of Miss Nepal World.

Early life

Pageantry

Miss Nepal 2022 
Priyanka won Miss Nepal World 2022 succeeding Namrata Shrestha (model) and received Rs 250,000 cash and a scooter.

Miss World 2023 
She will represent Nepal in Miss World 2023.

References

External links

Living people
Nepalese models
Nepalese female models
1998 births
Miss World 2022 delegates